Heidelberg Middle School (HMS) was an American school in Heidelberg, Germany.  The students attending HMS were the children of Department of Defense employees.  Heidelberg Middle School was located on Patrick Henry Village.  It had 650 students in grades 6-8. One-third of the children at the school rotated out of the school each year with their parents’ moves.

Heidelberg Middle School closed in August 2013 together with the rest of the US military installations in Heidelberg.

References

External links 
Official site
Department of Defense Dependent Schools Europe
Department of Defense Education site

American international schools in Germany
International schools in Baden-Württemberg
Schools in Heidelberg
Department of Defense Education Activity
Educational institutions with year of establishment missing
Defunct schools in Germany